Diack is a surname. Notable people with the surname include: 

 Lamine Diack (1933–2021), Senegalese businessman, sports administrator, and former athlete
 Robbie Diack (born 1985), South African-born Irish rugby union player
 Tuppy Diack (born 1935), former New Zealand rugby union player